The 1989 World Fencing Championships were held in Denver, United States from July 5 to July 15.

Overview
The United States applied to organise World Fencing Championships as soon as the 1986 congress of the International Fencing Federation (FIE). They maintained their request the year after, suggesting Cleveland or Indianapolis as hosts. The latter was chosen, but withdrew three months before the event. Denver put itself forward as replacement.

The competition was marred by several incidents involving the directoire technique. For instance, Bulgaria's men sabre team unknowingly arrived late at their quarter-final match against West Germany, as the official timetable had been changed along the way; the West Germans requested and obtained the Bulgarians' disqualification.

The USSR and West Germany dominated the championships, especially in foil and sabre. Épée saw several surprises, notably the victory of Spain's Manuel Pereira, who had never placed in the Top 8 of an international tournament before, and who never reached that level again. Women's épée was still a young weapon, allowed by the FIE at the 1988 World Criterium as a demonstration event. It made its first official apparition in Denver. An outsider, Switzerland's Anja Straub, prevailed over Germany's Ute Schäper and Italy's Annalisa Coltorti, while the women's team event saw the beginning of the Hungarian domination.

Medal table

Medal summary

Men's events

Women's events

References

FIE Results

World Fencing Championships
1989 in sports in Colorado
1980s in Denver
Sports competitions in Denver
International fencing competitions hosted by the United States
1989 in fencing
1989 in American sports
July 1989 sports events in the United States